This is a list of the seasons completed by the Indiana Hoosiers men's basketball team. The Hoosiers have an overall record of 1,912–1,103. They have appeared in the AP Poll 576 times, which is eighth all time.

Seasons

  Indiana and Purdue first met on March 2, 1901 in Bloomington, with a 20-15 Purdue win. Indiana originally planned to play a second game against Purdue in West Lafayette, but according to the Arbutus (the Indiana school yearbook) those games were "declared off, and the season ended at Indiana." The official records of Indiana and Purdue indicate that Indiana lost to Purdue 23–19 in West Lafayette on March 15, 1901. However, the Indiana University Basketball Encyclopedia by Jason Hiner notes that an absence of newspaper reports about the game suggests that it never took place. That source lists Indiana's record for the 1900–01 season as 1-3.
  Dakich served as the interim head coach at Indiana University, following Kelvin Sampson's resignation due to NCAA recruiting violations. Under Dakich's guidance, the Hoosiers went 3–4 and 3–2 in conference. Indiana went 22–4 under Sampson and 11–2 in conference.

References

 
Indiana
Indiana Hoosiers basketball seasons